Delmas Howe (born October 22, 1935) is an American Painter and muralist whose figurative work depicts mythological and archetypal – sometimes homoerotic – themes in a neoclassical, realist style.
. After graduation from high school he progressed through undergraduate work at Wichita State University, then four years in the US Air Force, a move to the East Coast, graduate work at Yale University and several years of classes in NYC at the Art Students League of New York while working as a professional musician. After a return to the West and a successful design studio in Amarillo, Texas he returned to Truth or Consequences, New Mexico. His work is in the collections of a number of museums including the Albuquerque Museum where his painting "The Three Graces" from 1978 is on permanent view, the British Museum, Amarillo Art Center, and the New Mexico Museum of Art.

The Truth or Consequences of Delmas Howe
The Truth or Consequences of Delmas Howe is a documentary which explores Howe's life, his work, and the controversy it has generated

References

1935 births
Living people
20th-century American painters
American male painters
21st-century American painters
American muralists
Artists from El Paso, Texas
Wichita State University alumni
Yale University alumni
Artists from New Mexico
LGBT people from New Mexico
American LGBT artists
People from Truth or Consequences, New Mexico
21st-century LGBT people
20th-century American male artists